This is a list of Lehigh Mountain Hawks football players in the NFL Draft.

Key

Selections

References

Lehigh

Lehigh Mountain Hawks NFL Draft